Licitars are colorfully decorated biscuits made of sweet honey dough that are part of Croatia and Slovenia's cultural heritage. They are a traditional symbol of the Croatian capital Zagreb. They are used as an ornamental gift, often given at celebrations of love such as weddings and Valentine's Day. At Christmas time, the city of Zagreb and the Christmas tree in the main square in particular are festooned with thousands of licitar hearts.

In 2010, UNESCO added the Gingerbread craft from Northern Croatia to the "Representative List of the Intangible Cultural Heritage" for Croatian culture.

History and tradition 

The tradition of making and giving Licitars stretching as far back as the 16th century. Licitar makers, known as Medičari, were highly regarded in society, and their Licitars very much sought after (licitars were more sentimental than giving a bouquet of roses). Even today the tradition is kept alive by a select few who covet the art in family secrecy, and their methods of production have scarcely changed. One Licitar still takes over a month to make.

Licitars became famous due to their being sold at the Marian shrine of Marija Bistrica (near Zagreb) to which pilgrims visited St Mary of Bistrica for the Assumption or St Margaret's Day. Although not a religious symbol, licitars were often bought to take home as a reminder of their long and sometimes arduous journey to Zagorje. Licitars' simple shape and attractive colour and decorations were a keen souvenir to show their families and neighbours when they came back.

Ingredients and preparation 
 Licitars are made using traditional ingredients, methods and devotion. Their ingredients are simple (honey, flour, eggs, water and natural colours) but their preparation is long. The dough matures for a few days, then is shaped and baked and left for two weeks to dry. Colouring is the next step after which they are left to dry again for two weeks. Once dry the licitars are finally decorated and again left to dry for a week.

Traditionally, Licitars are 100% handmade and usually decorated with a swirling outline, small flowers and sometimes a small mirror. Since they are made of honey dough and natural products, they can be edible before certain decorations are done.

Licitars are often erroneously referred to as gingerbread, although they do not actually contain ginger.

Modern uses 
In modern times, Licitars are traditional Croatian and Slovenian souvenirs (and can be found in all Croatian and Slovenian airports and in many tourist gift shops), Christmas tree decorations, wedding favours for guests, business gifts, many other ornamental purposes, and is still given as a way of showing your affection to the ones you love.

See also
 Culture of Croatia
 Culture of Slovenia
 Lebkuchen

References

External links 

 www.licitarheart.com
 Licitar Recipe

Croatian cuisine
Slovenian cuisine
Slovenian culture
Masterpieces of the Oral and Intangible Heritage of Humanity
Culture in Zagreb